Fenglingdu railway station is a railway station in Fenglingdu, Ruicheng County, Yuncheng, Shanxi, China. It is an intermediate stop on the Datong–Puzhou railway. It handles passengers and freight.

In 2021 there was a daily service between here and Linfen, a service in both directions between Linfen and Suzhou, and a daily service to Shenzhen West.

References 

Railway stations in Shanxi